Pete's Candy Store is a New York City performing space, bar and club located in the Williamsburg section of Brooklyn.

It is located at 709 Lorimer Street, between Frost Street and Richardson Street. Notable acts associated with the venue include Lizzie West, The Reverend Vince Anderson and Will Oldham. Pete's hosts a weekly trivia and weekly open mic night, and monthly reading, poetry, LGBTQ+, comedy, and performance nights alongside a calendar of nightly free musical performances. 

It was the New York City home of pastor Jay Bakker's Revolution church.

External links
Official website
Revolution NYC

Nightclubs in New York City